Brian's Song is a 1971 ABC Movie of the Week that recounts the life of Brian Piccolo (James Caan), a Chicago Bears football player stricken with terminal cancer, focusing on his friendship with teammate Gale Sayers (Billy Dee Williams). Piccolo's and Sayers's sharply differing temperaments and racial backgrounds made them unlikely to become friends but they did, becoming the first interracial roommates in the history of the National Football League. The film chronicles the evolution of their friendship, ending with Piccolo's death in 1970. The production was such a success on ABC that it was later shown in theaters by Columbia Pictures with a major premiere in Chicago; however, it was soon withdrawn for lack of business. Critics have called the movie one of the finest television movies ever made. A 2005 readers' poll taken by Entertainment Weekly ranked Brian's Song seventh in its list of the top "guy-cry" films.

The movie is based on Sayers's account of his friendship with Piccolo and coping with Piccolo's illness in Sayers's 1970 autobiography, I Am Third. The film was written by William Blinn, whose script one Dallas television critic called "highly restrained, steering clear of any overt sentimentality [yet conveying] the genuine affection the two men felt so deeply for each other."

Plot
The movie begins as Chicago Bears rookie running back Gale Sayers arrives at team practice as an errant punt lands near him. Fellow rookie running back Brian Piccolo goes to retrieve the ball, and Sayers flips it to him. Before Sayers meets with coach George Halas in his office, Piccolo tells him – as a prank – that Halas has a hearing problem, and Sayers acts strangely at the meeting. Sayers pranks him back by placing mashed potatoes on his seat while Piccolo is singing his alma mater's fight song.

During practice, Piccolo struggles while Sayers shines. Sayers and Piccolo are placed as roommates, a rarity during the racial strife at the time. Piccolo is afraid that he did not make the team, but Sayers makes the point that "if you didn't make the team, we wouldn't be placed together as roommates." Their friendship flourishes, in football and in life, quickly extending to their wives, Joy Piccolo and Linda Sayers. Sayers quickly becomes a standout player, but he injures his knee in a game against the San Francisco 49ers. To aid in Sayers's recovery, Piccolo brings a weight machine to his house. In Sayers' place, Piccolo rushes for 160 yards in a 17–16 win over the Los Angeles Rams and is given the game ball. Piccolo challenges Sayers to a race across the park, where Sayers stumbles but wins. Piccolo wins the starting fullback position, meaning both he and Sayers will now be on the field together, and both excel in their roles.

Piccolo starts to lose weight and his performance declines, so he is sent to a hospital for a diagnosis. Soon after, Halas tells Sayers that Piccolo has cancer and will have part of a lung removed. In an emotional speech to his teammates, Sayers states that they will win the game for Piccolo and give him the game ball. When the players later visit the hospital, Piccolo teases them about losing the game, laughing that the line in the old movie wasn't "let’s blow one for the Gipper."

After a game against the St. Louis Cardinals, Sayers visits Joy, who reveals that Piccolo has to have another surgery for his tumor. After he is awarded the "George S. Halas Most Courageous Player Award", Sayers dedicates his award to Piccolo, telling the crowd that they had selected the wrong person for the prize and saying, "I love Brian Piccolo, and I'd like all of you to love him, too. And tonight, when you hit your knees, please ask God to love him." In a call, Sayers mentions that he gave Piccolo a pint of blood while he was in critical condition. Piccolo dies with his wife by his side. The movie ends with a flashback of Piccolo and Sayers running through the park, while Halas narrates that Piccolo died at age 26 and is remembered not for how he died but for how he lived.

Cast

Music
The musical theme to Brian's Song, "The Hands of Time", was a popular tune during the early 1970s and has become a standard. The music for the film was by Michel Legrand, with lyrics to the song by Alan and Marilyn Bergman.

Legrand's instrumental version of the theme song charted for eight weeks in 1972, peaking at No. 56 on the Billboard Hot 100. It also won the Grammy Award for Best Instrumental Composition.

Reception
The film received acclaim and is often cited as one of the greatest television films ever made, as well as one of the greatest sports films.

The film was the most watched movie on U.S. television during 1971 and the most watched made-for-TV movie ever with a Nielsen rating of 32.9 and an audience share of 48% until it was surpassed by The Night Stalker in January 1972.

It holds a 92% "Fresh" score on Rotten Tomatoes based on 12 critics, with a consensus stating "Buoyed by standout performances from James Caan and Billy Dee Williams, Brian's Song is a touching tale of friendship whose central relationship transcendeds its standard sports movie moments."

In his 2016 book co-written with Alan Sepinwall titled TV (The Book), television critic Matt Zoller Seitz named Brian's Song as the fifth greatest American TV-movie of all time, stating that the film was "The dramatic and emotional template for a good number of sports films and male weepies (categories which tend to overlap a bit)", as well as "an influential early example of the interracial buddy movie." Filmink magazine said the film "has a deserved reputation for the definitive guy cry movie – cancer, race, football, stoicism."

Accolades

Remake

Thirty years after its original airing, a remake was aired in 2001 on ABC's The Wonderful World of Disney starring Mekhi Phifer as Sayers and Sean Maher as Piccolo.

References

External links
 
 
 
 
 

1971 television films
1971 drama films
1971 films
1970s American films
1970s biographical drama films
1970s buddy drama films
1970s sports drama films
ABC Movie of the Week
American buddy drama films
American football films
American sports drama films
Biographical films about sportspeople
Chicago Bears
Columbia Pictures films
Cultural depictions of players of American football
Films about cancer
Films based on biographies
Films directed by Buzz Kulik
Films scored by Michel Legrand
Films shot in Indiana
Peabody Award-winning broadcasts
Sports films based on actual events